Tiago Jorge Honório or simply Tiago  (born 4 December 1977 in Americana), is a Brazilian football striker, who plays for Independente de Limeira in Brazil.

Honours

Club
Atlético-PR
Paraná State League: 2005

Suwon Bluewings
Korean FA Cup: 2009

External links

 
 CBF 
 
 kirinsoccer 

1977 births
Living people
Brazilian footballers
Brazilian expatriate footballers
União Agrícola Barbarense Futebol Clube players
Shenzhen F.C. players
Sanfrecce Hiroshima players
Club Athletico Paranaense players
Beijing Guoan F.C. players
Chengdu Tiancheng F.C. players
Chinese Super League players
China League One players
Goiás Esporte Clube players
Expatriate footballers in Japan
J1 League players
J2 League players
Fagiano Okayama players
Expatriate footballers in China
K League 1 players
Suwon Samsung Bluewings players
Expatriate footballers in South Korea
Brazilian expatriate sportspeople in China
Brazilian expatriate sportspeople in South Korea
Association football forwards